Dejhoor is an ornament worn by Kashmiri Hindu brides, from the day before they are wed in holy matrimony. The jewelry is hung off of the ear and later is replaced with a gold chain known as an ath at her to-be husband's home. The athur, which is a small gold ornament, is added attached to the dejhoor. The dejhoor symbolizes a yantra denoting Shiva and Shakti.

See also
Culture of Kashmir

References

Kashmiri Hindus
Culture of Kashmir
History of Kashmir
Indian wedding clothing